Ingela Andersson (born 16 July 1991) is a Swedish biathlete. She resides in Östersund. She competed at the Biathlon World Championships 2013 in Nové Město na Moravě, and at the Biathlon World Championships 2016 in Oslo.

References

1991 births
Living people
Swedish female biathletes
People from Sollefteå Municipality